Highway 920 is a provincial highway in the north-east region of the Canadian province of Saskatchewan. It runs from Narrow Hills Provincial Park until it transitions into Highway 933. The highway is closed between the McDougal Creek and Mossy River crossings.

Highway 920 also connects with Highway 120 and Highway 932.

See also 
Roads in Saskatchewan
Transportation in Saskatchewan

References 

920